WENT (1340 kHz) is a commercial AM radio station broadcasting a Full Service Adult Contemporary radio format, with a heavy emphasis on local news, weather and sports information. Licensed to Gloversville, New York, the station primarily serves the Fulton & Montgomery County portion of New York's Mohawk Valley.  It is owned by Michael Schaus.  WENT carries New York Yankees baseball games an weekly NFL games, as well as high school football and basketball.  World and national news is covered by CBS Radio News.

WENT is powered at 1,000 watts, non-directional.  It also operates FM translator W286CD at 105.1 MHz, co-located at the WENT AM broadcast facility.

History
WENT signed on the air in 1944.  It broadcast at 250 watts and was owned by the Sacandaga Broadcasting Company at 8 West Fulton Street.  It was a network affiliate of CBS Radio and the Mutual Broadcasting System.  It carried their dramas, comedies, news, sports, soap operas, game shows and big band broadcasts during the "Golden Age of Radio."

In 2013, it added an FM translator, 105.1 W286CD, for listeners who prefer to hear the station in FM stereo.

References

External links
FCC History Cards for WENT

ENT